Sieghart may refer to any of the following:

 Sieg Hart, a fictional character in the anime/manga Rave Master
 Mary Ann Sieghart, an English journalist
 William Sieghart, a British philanthropist
 Groß-Siegharts, a municipality in the district of Waidhofen
 Sieghart, a major character in the video game Record of Agarest War Zero
 Ercnard Sieghart, a hero in the RPG online game Grand Chase